A Hand Is on the Gate is a play presented off-Broadway in 1966 that was actor Roscoe Lee Browne's Broadway directorial debut. It was produced by Ivor David Balding and Stephen Aaron, music arranged by Bill Lee and Stuart Scharf, lighting design by Jules Fisher. 

Josephine Premice received a Tony Award nomination for her performance in the play.

References

1966 plays
African-American plays
Broadway plays